The 1992 Kent Classic was a professional non-ranking snooker tournament that took place between 26 and 30 August 1992 at the Hiadian Stadium in Beijing, China. John Parrott won the title, defeating Stephen Hendry 6–5 in the final, and received £25,000 prize money from a total prize fund of £100,000.

Results

Note

References

Kent Cup (snooker)
Kent Classic
Kent Classic
Kent Classic